Shirley Graham Du Bois (born Lola Shirley Graham Jr.; November 11, 1896 – March 27, 1977) was an American-Ghanaian writer, playwright, composer, and activist for African-American causes, among others. She won the Messner and the Anisfield-Wolf prizes for her works.

Biography
She was born Lola Shirley Graham Jr. in Indianapolis, Indiana, in 1896, as the only daughter among five children. Her father was an African Methodist Episcopal minister and the family moved often due to her father's work in parsonages throughout the country. In June 1915, Shirley graduated from Lewis and Clark High School in Spokane, Washington.

She married her first husband, Shadrach T. McCants, in 1921. Their son Robert was born in 1923, followed by David Graham DuBois in 1925. In 1926, Graham moved to Paris, France, to study music composition at the Sorbonne. She thought that this education might allow her to achieve better employment and be able to better support her children. Meeting Africans and Afro-Caribbean people in Paris introduced her to new music and cultures. Graham and McCants divorced in 1927.

Graham served as music librarian while attending Howard University as a nonmatriculated student under the tutelage of Professor Roy W. Tibbs. He recommended her for a teaching position at Morgan College which led to her position as head of the music department from 1929 to 1931.

In 1931, Graham entered Oberlin College as an advanced student and, after earning her BA in 1934, went on to do graduate work in music, completing a master's degree in 1935. In 1936, Hallie Flanagan appointed Graham director of the Chicago Negro Unit of the Federal Theater Project, part of President Franklin D. Roosevelt's Works Progress Administration. She wrote musical scores, directed, and did additional associated work.

In 1932 she composed the opera Tom-Tom: An Epic of Music and the Negro which premiered in Cleveland, Ohio, commissioned by the Stadium Opera Company. Tom Tom featured an all Black cast and orchestra, structured in three acts; act one taking place in an Indigenous African tribe, act two portraying an American slave plantation, and the final act taking place in 1920s Harlem. The music features elements of blues and spirituals, as well as jazz with elements of opera. The score of this opera was considered lost and has not been performed since its premiere until it was rediscovered in 2001 at Harvard University.

Graham briefly worked at the Federal Theatre Project before it was shut down in 1939 by a group of anti-communists. Elizabeth Dilling – a white-supremacist and staunch anti-communist – as well as Senator Robert Rice Reynolds, a Nazi sympathizer and anti-semite, sought to defund the Federal Theatre Project. The Federal Theatre Project eventually was defunded as a result of this anti-communist and racist rhetoric. From 1940 to 1942 Graham worked at the Phillis Wheatley Young Women's Christian Association (YWCA) in Indianapolis, Indiana, where she focused on establishing a theatre program and then became the director of the YMCA-USO group in Fort Huachuca, Arizona. The YWCA supported the Federal Anti-Lynching Law. However, Elizabeth Dilling and anti-communist and white-supremacist groups had claimed that YWCA was a "Communist-front organizations controlled by Jews" and attacked the organization's support for equal rights for Black peoples. Dilling's publication of "Red Channels" ultimately launched anti-communist backlash against Graham Du Bois, resulting in her work being pulled from libraries and censored.

In the late 1940s, Graham became a member of Sojourners for Truth and Justicean African-American organization working for global women's liberation. Around the same time, she joined the American Communist Party.

In 1951, she married W. E. B. Du Bois, the second marriage for both. She was 54 years old; he was 83. In 1958, Graham Du Bois and her husband visited Ghana, where she spoke at the All-African Peoples' Conference (AAPC), an event held by 62 African National Liberation organizations where she delivered a speech titled "The Future of All-Africa lies in Socialism" where she stated “Africa, ancient Africa, has been called by the world and has lifted up her hands! Africa has no choice between private capitalism and socialism. The whole world, including capitalist countries, is moving toward socialism, inevitably, inexorably. You can choose between blocs of military alliance, you can choose between groups of political union; you cannot choose between socialism and private capitalism because private capitalism is doomed.” In 1960 the Du Boises attended a ceremony in the Republic of Ghana honoring Kwame Nkrumah as the first president of the newly liberated country. Graham Du Bois and W. E. B. Du Bois later became citizens of Ghana in 1961.

Graham Du Bois attended the Second Summit of the Organization of African Unity (OAU) in Cairo in 1964 and consulted with Malcolm X on the efforts of the Organization of Afro-American Unity (OAAU) to get support for the issues inside the US among heads of state, the UN and national liberation movements. Graham announced the start of a course on television screenwriting in Accra to create a group of writers for Ghana National Television.

During her first visit to China in 1959, Graham Du Bois, alongside her husband W. E. B. Du Bois, was commemorated in China for their activism and commitment to Black liberation, as well as to liberation of all people of color across the globe. The Communist Party of China in 1959 commemorated W. E. B. Du Bois by publishing his book The Soul of Black Folk in Chinese languages. Graham Du Bois devoted her time in China to the women's struggle and sought to bridge ties between the proletarian struggle in China with the struggle of Black Americans. The People's Daily recognized her as a member of the World Peace Council and of the national committee for the Association of American-Soviet Friendship.

In 1967, she was forced to leave Ghana soon after the 1966 military-led coup d'état, and moved to Cairo, Egypt, where her surviving son David was working as a journalist. There she continued writing, studied Arabic and become a supporter of Afrocentrism. Later she moved to China again in the midst of the “Great Proletarian Cultural Revolution”. During this time, Graham Du Bois sided with the Chinese communists in the Sino-Soviet split. She had praised China's music programs in Shanghai and she joined the Bureau of Afro-Asian Writers. Graham Du Bois spent a good amount of time in Chinese communes and with the Red Guards.

She gave talks at Yale and UCLA in 1970, where she was able to speak on imperialism, capitalism and colonialism and her experiences in countries undergoing socialist construction, such as China and Vietnam. She also gave W. E. B. Du Bois' writings to the University of Massachusetts, Amherst.

She produced a movie in China called Women of the New China in 1974. Shirley Graham Du Bois passed away in Beijing, China in 1977, where she is buried in the Babaoshan Revolutionary Cemetery. Her funeral was attended by many important political figures in China, including Cheng Yonggui, Deng Yingchao, and Hua Goufeng, where they honored her as a hero for her internationalism and selflessness. The Communist Party Chairman lay a memorial wreath in honor of Graham Du Bois, as did the embassies of Tanzania, Ghana, and Zambia.

Death
Shirley Graham Du Bois died of breast cancer on March 27, 1977, aged 80, in Beijing, China. She died as a citizen of Tanzania, Ghana, and the United States of America. She had moved from Ghana to Tanzania after Ghanaian president, Kwame Nkrumah, was overthrown on 24 February 1966, and became close to Tanzanian president, Julius Nyerere, and acquired Tanzanian citizenship.

Honors
Her alma mater Oberlin Conservatory of Music recently honored DuBois offering cluster courses and a conference devoted to reviving her remarkable legacy as a composer, activist and media figure. The conference was called Intersections: Recovering the Genius of Shirley Graham Du Bois 2020 Symposium on Thursday and Friday, February 27 and 28, 2020, that included a plenary lecture by Columbia professor and author Farah Jasmine Griffin. The event was co-sponsored by The Gertrude B. Lemle Teaching Center, StudiOC, a grant from the Andrew W. Mellon Foundation, Dean of The college, Dean of the Conservatory, History Department, Oberlin College Libraries, Africana Studies Department, and the Theater Department.

Her papers are archived at;
W.E.B. Du Bois Manuscript Collection at the University of Massachusetts in Amherst, Massachusetts
Federal Theatre Project collection at George Mason University in Fairfax, Virginia
Washington Conservatory of Music Collection in the Moorland-Spingarn Research Library at Howard University in Washington, D.C.
Schlesinger Library on the History of Women in America, Harvard Radcliffe Institute, Cambridge, MA

Works
After meeting Africans in Paris while studying at the Sorbonne in 1926, Graham composed the musical score and libretto of Tom Tom: An Epic of Music and the Negro (1932), an opera. She used music, dance and the book to express the story of Africans' journey to the North American colonies, through slavery and to freedom. It premiered in Cleveland, Ohio. The opera attracted 10,000 people to its premiere at the Cleveland Stadium and 15,000 to the second performance.

According to the Oxford Companion to African-American Literature, her theatre works included Deep Rivers (1939), a musical; It's Morning (1940), a one-act tragedy about a slave mother who contemplates infanticide; I Gotta Home (1940), a one-act drama; Track Thirteen (1940), a comedy for radio and her only published play; Elijah's Raven (1941), a three-act comedy; and Dust to Earth (1941), a three-act tragedy.

Graham used theater to tell the black woman's story and perspective, countering white versions of history. Despite her unsuccessful attempts to land a Broadway production as many African American women before and after her, her plays were still produced by Karamu Theatre in Cleveland and other major Black companies. Her work was also seen in many colleges and both Track Thirteen (1940) and Tom-Tom were aired on the radio.

Due to the difficulty in getting musicals or plays produced and published, Graham turned to literature. She wrote in a variety of genres, specializing from the 1950s in biographies of leading African-American and world figures for young readers. She wanted to increase the number of books that dealt with notable African Americans in elementary school libraries. Owing to her personal knowledge of her subjects, her books on Paul Robeson and Kwame Nkrumah are considered especially interesting. Other subjects included Frederick Douglass, Phillis Wheatley, and Booker T. Washington; as well as Gamal Abdul Nasser, and Julius Nyerere. One of her last novels, Zulu Heart (1974), included sympathetic portrayals of whites in South Africa despite racial conflicts.

Selections from her correspondence with her husband (both before and after their relationship began) appear in the three volume 1976 collection edited by Herbert Aptheker (ed.), Correspondence of W.E.B. Du Bois. Shirley Graham Du Bois is the subject of Race Woman: The Lives of Shirley Graham Du Bois.

Biographical Works
Biographies for young readers:
with George D. Lipscomb, Dr. George Washington Carver, Scientist, New York: Julian Messner, 1944, (Library binding has )
Paul Robeson, Citizen of the World, Connecticut, 1946: Greenwood Press, reprint 1972
Your Most Humble Servant: Benjamin Banneker, New York: Julian Messner, 1949; winner of the Anisfield-Wolf Book Award in 1950
The Story of Phillis Wheatley: Poetess of the Revolution, New York: Julian Messner, 1949
The Story of Pocahontas, New York: Grosset & Dunlap, 1953
Jean Baptiste Pointe duSable: Founder of Chicago (1953)
Booker T. Washington: Educator of Head, Hand and Heart, New York: Julian Messner, 1955
His Day Is Marching On: A Memoir of W.E.B. Du Bois, New York: Lippincott, 1971
Julius K. Nyerere, Teacher of Africa, New York: Julian Messner, 1975
Du Bois: A Pictorial Biography, Johnsons, 1978

Novels:
There Once Was a Slave (1947), the Messner Prize-winning historical novel on the life of Frederick Douglass; and
Zulu Heart, New York: Third Press, 1974

References

Sources
 Azikiwe, Abayomi. “Pan-Africanism, Shirley Graham Du Bois and Nkrumah's Ghana: Pambazuka News.” Pan-Africanism, Shirley Graham Du Bois and Nkrumah's Ghana | Pambazuka News, 16 Mar. 2017, www.pambazuka.org/pan-africanism/pan-africanism-shirley-graham-du-bois-and-nkrumah%E2%80%99s-Ghana.
D'Amato, Lilyanna. “The Legacy of Black Classical Music: Shirley Graham Du Bois.” Cleveland Classical, 8 July 2020, clevelandclassical.com/the-legacy-of-black-classical-music-shirley-graham-du-bois/.
Gao, Yunxiang. “W. E. B. AND SHIRLEY GRAHAM DU BOIS IN MAOIST CHINA1: Du Bois Review: Social Science Research on Race.” Cambridge Core, Cambridge University Press, 10 June 2013, www.cambridge.org/core/journals/du-bois-review-social-science-research-on-race/article/w-e-b-and-shirley-graham-du-bois-in-maoist-china1/6E4E596C1F3F4F874B6E8E6EE90F142F.
“Graham, Shirley.” Graham, Shirley | The Broadcast 41, broadcast41.uoregon.edu/biography/graham-shirley.
Hine, Darlene Clark (ed). Black Women in America: An Historical Encyclopedia, New York: Carlson, NY, 1993

Further reading/links
 Nishikawa, Kinohi. "Shirley Graham" entry, The Greenwood Encyclopedia of African American Literature. Ed. Hans Ostrom and J. David Macey, Jr. Westport, Connecticut: Greenwood Press, 2005, pp. 652–53.
 Thompson, Robert Dee. A socio-biography of Shirley Graham-Du Bois: a life in the struggle. University of California, Santa Cruz, 1997 (digitized August 4, 2009) 
 Shirley Graham Du Bois profile, African American Registry
 Shirley Graham Du Bois Papers, Schlesinger Library on the History of Women in America, Radcliffe Institute, Harvard University 
 Shirley Graham Du Bois bibliography, amazon.com; accessed May 2, 2014.
 FBI files on Shirley Graham Du Bois

1896 births
1977 deaths
Activists for African-American civil rights
African-American musicians
African-American women writers
20th-century American women writers
African-American writers
African-American composers
African-American women composers
African-American feminists
American feminist writers
American communists
American Marxists
American expatriates in Ghana
Ghanaian activists
Ghanaian women writers
Deaths from cancer in the People's Republic of China
Deaths from breast cancer
Marxist feminists
American Marxist writers
Writers from Evansville, Indiana
Radical feminists
American women composers
Communist women writers
Musicians from Evansville, Indiana
20th-century American composers
20th-century American women musicians
20th-century women composers
Feminist musicians
African-American women musicians
Federal Theatre Project administrators